The Merckle SM 67 was an experimental helicopter built in West Germany in the late 1950s.

Design
The SM 67 was the first turbine-powered helicopter in Germany. The German Federal Ministry of Defense commissioned the development in 1957. The design of the SM 67 was similar to that of the Alouette II, including a metal frame of the rear fuselage. The first prototype flew on July 7, 1959, and flight tests revealed remarkably low vibration level as well as good controllability and stability. Therefore, two more prototypes were built, in which the experience gained with the first prototype was taken into account. However, the first prototype was destroyed during tests, and the Bundeswehr opted for the SE-3130 Alouette II rather than the SM 67 due to the earlier availability of the former.

Surviving examples
The second prototype was used at MBB as a test stand for components of the Bo 105. Together with the other, still preserved third prototype, it was later put together to form the machine that can be viewed today in the helicopter museum in Bückeburg.

Specifications

References

1950s German military utility aircraft
Military helicopters
1950s German helicopters
Single-turbine helicopters
Aircraft first flown in 1959